Lahtinen is a Finnish surname meaning "small bay". Notable people with the surname include:

 Alli Lahtinen (1926–1976), Finnish politician
 Aki Lahtinen (born 1958), Finnish footballer
 Hugo Lahtinen (1891–1977), Finnish athlete
 Juhani Lahtinen (born 1938), Finnish ice hockey goalkeeper
 Merja Lahtinen (born 1968), Finnish cross country skier
 Mika Lahtinen (born 1985), Finnish footballer
 Timo Lahtinen (born 1947), Finnish ice hockey player
 Urpo Lahtinen, Finnish magazine publisher
 Varma Lahtinen (1894–1976), Finnish actress
 Vesa Lahtinen (born 1968), Finnish ice hockey player

Finnish-language surnames